Certified Organic Sunscreen, also known as Petrochemical-Free Sunscreen, is a third party certified sunscreen consisting of certified and approved organic ingredients, with typically zinc oxide acting as the photo-protector. An organic sunscreen is verified and approved by a certifier to an international organic standard, such as NSF/ANSI 305, which define production and labelling requirements for personal care products containing organic ingredients. Sunscreen has photo-protective properties that reduce the risk of skin cancer and ageing with relation to the SPF value and proper application.

Certified organic sunscreen is part of a broader trend towards certified organic cosmetics and certified natural cosmetics. Especially in the sunscreen market, developers have been 'pushed' towards alternatives to petrochemical UV filters due to their lack of safety data and their detrimental ecological effects, resulting in petrochemical UV filters being banned in different countries and ecological areas.

Organisations that manage standards and certifiers generally provide allowances for minerals zinc oxide and titanium dioxide towards their organic calculation as they have photo-protective properties and a well regarded safety profile.

Certified Organic refers to the processing and production of a personal care product without the use of synthetic pesticides, herbicides, petrochemicals, aromatic hydrocarbons and other contaminants or practices. Petrochemical suppliers might market their ingredients as organic compounds however this does not mean they are organic or certified organic. Marketing products under organic is protected by consumer commissions such as the Australian Competition & Consumer Commission and other national bodies.

Major standards

NSF/ANSI 305: Organic Personal Care Products 
Created by Non-For Profit Organization NSF. It is an International Standard designed specifically for Organic Personal Care Products. The NSF itself is a World Health Organization (WHO) Collaborating Centre for Food and Water Safety and Indoor Environment.

USDA National Organic Program (NOP)  
Due to the fact that the FDA does not define or regulate the term “organic” in personal care products, the USDA has taken responsibility. The USDA, United States Department of Agriculture, has been regulating organic cosmetics and personal care products, effective since 2001, under the National Organic Program. Unlike personal care products, sunscreen is regulated by the FDA as an OTC drug and thus has a GRASE monograph, so it is possible that the FDA may expand its role in regulating organic sunscreen in the future. Currently only zinc oxide and titanium dioxide have been determined by the FDA to be generally recognised as safe and effective (GRASE).

ISO 16128: Natural and organic cosmetic ingredients and products 
ISO (International Organization for Standardization) is an independent, non-governmental international organisation with a membership of 167 national standards bodies. Cosmos has claimed the ISO:16128 standard is overly broad, despite being on the committee that made and approved it. The ISO:16128 standard is an official contributor to UN's Sustainable Development Goals; 3,12

Ecocert Cosmos Organic 
The Cosmos Natural and Organic standard was established in 2002. It has received criticism for not calculating minerals, such as zinc oxide, towards the organic percentage of a product.

Natrue 
Natrue was created in 2007. The first Natrue labelled product launched in 2009. There are now over 7000 Natrue certified products. The standard is for natural and organic cosmetics.

Green approved list of ingredient for certified organic sunscreens 
Certified organic sunscreens or products must comply with certifiers 'green list' of ingredients that are safe and represent their organic standard. Ingredients that are not permitted generally include: Silicones, Parabens, Microplastics, Synthetic Fragrances, Synthetic Colorants, Petrochemicals and certain preservatives such as Phenoxyethanol. As well as non naturally occurring contaminants such as heavy metals, pesticides, aromatic hydrocarbons, dioxins, PCBs, radioactivity, mycotoxins, nitrates, nitrosamines.

Certified organic production lractices 
Major organic certifiers prohibit animal testing for the product to carry their label  and European certifiers generally require the ingredients to be non-GMO. Organic certifiers do not allow the use of synthetic pesticides or chemical fertilisers in the production of certified organic ingredients.

Active ingredients in certified organic sunscreen 
Petrochemical UV filters are not recognised as organic by most private certifiers, such as Cosmos (standard), as they are a byproduct of petroleum. Certified organic and natural UV protectors Titanium Dioxide and Zinc Oxide, "TiO2 and ZnO[,] represent the only effective alternatives to ultraviolet (UV) filters of petrochemical origin regarding photoprotection, and they contribute significantly to the safety of consumers who use them."

Reported cases of benzene contamination have resulted in sunscreen recalls initiated by regulators such as the TGA and FDA or voluntarily by the brand. The contamination could have occurred from the degradation of benzene-based ingredients, such as petrochemical UV filters or from supply chain neglect. Most notably Valisure, an independent Connecticut based laboratory, found benzene contamination in products such as sunscreen, deodorant and hand sanitiser resulting in over 25 million products being recalled in the US since 2019.

Ecological advantages of certified organic sunscreen 
Certified Organic Sunscreen bans the use of petrochemical active ingredients such as Avobenzone. Avobenzone is one of the most frequently used UV filters on the market. Avobenzone and other petrochemical UV filters  have been shown to cause damage to marine ecosystems such as coral reefs and harm marine life. Avobenzone has also been shown to absorb into your bloodstream after application in an FDA funded study.

References 

Ecology
Environment and health
Veganism